Hinshelwood is a surname. Notable people with the surname include:

Adam Hinshelwood, English footballer
Ben Hinshelwood, rugby player
Cyril Norman Hinshelwood, chemist
Danny Hinshelwood, English footballer
Martin Hinshelwood, English former footballer
Paul Hinshelwood, English former footballer
Sandy Hinshelwood, Scottish rugby player